Anna Sergeyevna Chepeleva (born on June 26, 1984) was an Olympic gymnast at the 2000 Olympic Games. She won a silver medal with the Russian team.

Competitive history

See also 
 List of Olympic female gymnasts for Russia

References 

1984 births
Living people
Russian female artistic gymnasts
Gymnasts at the 2000 Summer Olympics
Olympic gymnasts of Russia
Olympic silver medalists for Russia
People from Volzhsky, Volgograd Oblast
Olympic medalists in gymnastics
Medalists at the 2000 Summer Olympics
Sportspeople from Volgograd Oblast
21st-century Russian women